Mirabella was a women's magazine published from June 1989 to April 2000. It was created by and named for Grace Mirabella, a former Vogue editor in chief, in partnership with Rupert Murdoch.

It was originally published by News Corporation, and it became the property of Hachette Filipacchi in 1995. Known as a smart women's magazine, it suffered in comparison to Elle, a more lighthearted issue from the same publisher. Declining ad revenue contributed to a reported $9 million loss in 1999, and the magazine folded immediately after the debut of Oprah Winfrey's magazine O in April 2000.

Mirabella'''s circulation stood at 558,009 at the time of its demise.

Editors
Amy Gross (1989–1993, 1995–1997)
Gay Bryant (1993–1995)
Dominique Browning (1995)
Roberta Myers (1997–2000)

Cultural references
In the Family Guy episode "Fore, Father", Stewie Griffin picks up the December issue of Mirabella in the doctor's waiting room.

In a season 3 Sex and the City episode, Samantha (Kim Cattrall) says that she never should have signed up for a Mirabella trial subscription.

In season 4 of Scrubs, a goalie for the Philadelphia Flyers hockey club sees an issue of Mirabella and changes his last name to Mirabella. He goes on to be the number one goalie in the National Hockey League (NHL).

In the episode "The State Dinner" of The West Wing, Press Secretary C.J. Cregg is irritated that the reporter from Mirabella is asking about food & wine in her press briefings.

In Jeffrey Eugenides' short story "Baster", Tomasina learns of age-related fertility issues from an issue of Mirabella.

Terence Trent D'Arby mentions the magazine on "Castilian Blue", a track from his 1993 album, Symphony or Damn.

In the 1993 film Sister Act, a mock cover featuring Whoopi Goldberg as Deloris Van Cartier is made and used during the credit reel at the end of the film along with Rolling Stone, TIME, and National Enquirer''.

References

Bimonthly magazines published in the United States
Monthly magazines published in the United States
Defunct women's magazines published in the United States
Magazines established in 1989
Magazines disestablished in 2000
Magazines published in New York City
Women's fashion magazines